Abafungin (INN) is a broad-spectrum antifungal agent with a novel mechanism of action for the treatment of dermatomycoses.

Abasol is a topical cream formulation of abafungin by York Pharma.

History
Abafungin was first synthesized at Bayer AG, Leverkusen, Germany.  A study of H2-antagonists related to famotidine, resulted in the discovery of its antifungal properties.

Its development seems to have been discontinued in 2009.

Mechanism of action
Unlike imidazole- and triazole-class antifungals, abafungin directly impairs the fungal cell membrane.

In addition, abafungin inhibits the enzyme sterol 24-C-methyltransferase, modifying the composition of the fungal membrane.

Abafungin has antibiotic activity against gram-positive bacteria as well as sporicidal activity.

References

External links
 

Antifungals
Thiazoles
Diphenyl ethers
Pyrimidines